Arthure Agathine (17 December 1960 – 24 October 2016) was a Seychellois athlete. He competed in the men's triple jump at the 1980 Summer Olympics. He was a three-time national champion in the triple jump between 1981 and 1983.

He later worked as an athletics coach. He died in 2016 after a short illness.

References

External links

1960 births
2016 deaths
Athletes (track and field) at the 1980 Summer Olympics
Seychellois male triple jumpers
Olympic athletes of Seychelles
Place of birth missing